State Route 58 (SR 58) was a  state highway in Centreville in Bibb County. The western terminus of the highway was at an intersection with US 82/SR 25/SR 219. The eastern terminus of the highway was at a second intersection with US 82. SR 58 traveled through the historic business district of Centreville.

Route description
SR 58 began at an intersection with former US 82/SR 6/SR 25/SR 219 (now SR 382) in Centreville, heading east on two-lane undivided Walnut Street. The highway headed into the historic business district of the town, intersecting former SR 209 at the town square. Farther east, the highway headed into wooded residential areas. SR 58 curved to the southeast and reaches its eastern terminus at an intersection with US 82/SR 6.

History
State Route 58 was decommissioned in August 2015, along with State Route 209, when US 82 was rerouted, and SR 382 was created.

Major intersections

See also

References

External links

058
Transportation in Bibb County, Alabama